Algeria, participated at the 2015 African Games held in the city of Brazzaville, Republic of the Congo. It participated with 235 athletes in 18 sports.

Medal summary

Medal table

|  style="text-align:left; width:78%; vertical-align:top;"|

|  style="text-align:left; width:22%; vertical-align:top;"|

Paralympic sports

Athletics

Men

Women

Badminton

Men

Women

Mixed

Basketball

Roster 

|}
| valign="top" |
 Head coach

 Assistant coach

Legend
 (C) Team captain
 Club field describes current club
|}

Women

Group B

Beach volleyball

Boxing

Men

Cycling

Road

Fencing

Gymnastics

Judo

Karate

Pétanque

Swimming

Men

Qualification Legend: FA=Final A (medal); FB=Final B (non-medal)

Women

Qualification Legend: FA=Final A (medal); FB=Final B (non-medal)

Mixed

Qualification Legend: FA=Final A (medal); FB=Final B (non-medal)

Table tennis

Taekwondo

Tennis

Volleyball

Men

Group B

|}

|}

Final round

Semifinals

|}

Final

|}

Women

Group B

|}

|}

Weightlifting

Wrestling

References

Nations at the 2015 African Games
2015
All-Africa Games